Lepakshi Degree College is a college located in the Proddatur, Kadapa district of Andhra Pradesh, India.  It is affiliated to Yogi Vemana University. The college was established by a group of trio friends on 1 June 2003 under Sri Lokeswara Educational Society. Till 2010 the college was affiliated to Sri Venkateswara University and further the affiliation changed to Yogi Vemana University

Courses offered
 B.SC (M.P.CS)
 B.SC (M.S.CS)
 B.COM (Computers)

Colleges in Andhra Pradesh
Universities and colleges in Kadapa district
2003 establishments in Andhra Pradesh
Educational institutions established in 2003